Chris Bertish is a South African surfer, stand-up paddleboarder, adventurer, and motivational speaker. In 2004 he gained recognition as the owner of 'Best Cribbar Barrel Vision Ever' after he pulled into a giant closeout at the infamous big wave spot in Cornwall. He won the Mavericks Big Wave Surf contest in 2009. In March 2017 he completed the first solo, unsupported stand-up paddle board (SUP) crossing of  the Atlantic Ocean.  He did it while supporting charitable organizations.  He has also set other SUP world records.  His efforts moved an obscure sport onto the forefront of many important media outlets.

Background
In February 2010, Bertish competed at the 2009/10 Mavericks Surf Contest near Half Moon Bay, Northern California, winning the $50,000 big-wave surf competition. Bertish arrived at the competition without his equipment and had to borrow a board to compete.

In 2016, a failed attempt at crossing the Atlantic on a stand-up paddleboard occurred.  The boat was piloted by Nicholas Jarossay, a French citizen who was rescued a week into his trip.

Solo Atlantic crossing
In a 93-day trek, Bertish successfully completed a solo, unassisted and unaided crossing of the Atlantic Ocean on a stand up paddle board, going from Morocco to Antigua. The feat was the culmination of five years of preparation.

His $120,000 craft was designed by Phil Morrison, a naval architect, and resembles a connected row-boat and a stand-up paddle board, called ImpiFish. It had a "number of technological amenities such as a satellite phone, a radar device, a MacBook, a water maker"  carrying the amount of fresh water he needed was impractical. On 9 March 2017, he arrived in Antigua at English Harbour becoming the first person to cross the Atlantic on a stand-up paddle board. He made the journey unsupported and unassisted in 93 days. Initially he wanted to continue to Florida, but due to forecasted poor weather made his landfall in Antigua.

The craft was self-righting if it capsized, avoiding the possibility of turtling.  Gear included a life raft, flares, and an emergency grab bag.  An integral part of maintaining stability in adverse weather was the use of sea anchors.

Bertish averaged  a day, surpassing his planned  daily. Paddling was mainly done at night to avoid sun exposure.

The attempt was made in order to raise money for several South African charities to feed, school and provide medical operations for children and succeeded in raising $412,000. The charities include Signature of Hope Trust, the Lunchbox Foundation and Operation Smile. The attempt had been sponsored by the financial group Carrick Wealth.

In fact, he set at least three world records during the crossing; and promised to pay for a charitable surgery for each of them.

Adventurer
Previously he completed a 3½-day  paddle and a "source to sea" run-paddle-bike descent of the Thames River, with an English Channel SUP bonus crossing.

Unofficially and off the South African coast, he set the world record for 12-hour open ocean paddling, covering almost  aided by "great downwind conditions." The previous record was  held by an American.

Honours
Bertish has been chosen, as one of 100 visionary people, to contribute a 250 word essay to be included in a 3D book. The 3D book will be designed by artist Ron Arad and will be a world first and printed in zero gravity. Called, Genius: 100 Visions of the Future, it is organised by the Albert Einstein Foundation Initiative for the Inspired by Einstein Project.

In 2018, South African artist, Michael Lee, painted three large oil paintings to commemorate the transatlantic crossing, Atlantic Solo, featuring Bertish battling a storm at night, with a reference to Hokusai's Great Wave image, Atlantic Soul showing the SUP champion in equilibrium with a calm ocean and various aquatic creatures, and Atlantic Epic, illustrating Bertish's arrival at the Pillars of Hercules in Antigua to complete the epic journey.

References

Notes

Citations

External links
 Track Chris Bertish Live Tracker Map The SUP Crossing.
 Chris Bertish promotional video

See also
Standup paddleboarding

1974 births
Big wave surfing
Living people
South African surfers
Paddleboarders
South African motivational speakers
Guinness World Records